Cape Newenham is a geographical feature of the pacific coast of Alaska providing a namesake for:

 Cape Newenham Long Range Radar Site, a United States Air Force RADAR station operated during the cold war
 Cape Newenham LRRS Airport, a military airstrip in Alaska
 SS Cape Newenham (MC-502), a troop ship operated during World War II